Food Network Challenge is a competitive cooking television series that aired on the Food Network. In each episode, professional chefs vie in a timed competition in their professional specialty. The winner receives a cheque for $10,000 and a gold medal. The first run of the series started in 2005 as a number of specials, before becoming a regular series that launched in 2007 and ended in 2011.

On November 18, 2019, it was announced that the show would resume, with a premiere on December 23, 2019. Ian Ziering will be the new host.

Format
The competitions are judged by specialists in their culinary fields, dependent upon the particular 'challenge'. Contestants are given eight hours to complete a task and must adhere to the competition rules; for example, edible art cake competitions often require that a cake reaches a minimum height, exhibits a certain theme, and is able to be moved to a judging table without falling over. After eight hours, the host stops all activity by saying "Competitors, stop your work!".

Episodes are shot in front of a live audience, usually at tourist attractions such as the Mall of America or Disney World. Depending on the discipline and scope of the competition, the number of competitors can range from two to hundreds. Occasionally, regional competitions are held to determine who the competitors are to be each week. Some of the events are also held as world championships or as 'invitationals'.

The winner usually receives a check for $10,000 and a gold medal. In competitions featuring five or more competitors, silver and bronze medals are also sometimes awarded, though they have no cash prize.

In 2009, the show debuted its first elimination-style competition called Last Cake Standing. In this format, six cake designers competed for a prize of $50,000.

In April 2010, original host Keegan Gerhard was promoted to judge alongside Kerry Vincent, and was replaced as host by Claire Robinson. The way in which the results were read also changed for most of, but not all of the shows; where previously only the winner was announced, the newer format's results began with announcing the third- and fourth-place finishers, who were then asked to leave the stage before the victor was revealed.

Competitions
The competitions presented on the program covered a wide range of areas, from cake decorating to ice sculpting to teppanyaki to macaroni and cheese, with cakes being the most frequently-covered area.

Last Cake Standing
In April 2009, a special version of Challenge was launched called Last Cake Standing. This series began with six competitors, with an elimination at the end of each episode until only three competitors remained. The challenges in this series were often harder and longer and with more twists than those in the 'normal' series. The finale was the longest in challenge history, giving the last three remaining competitors — Courtney Clark, Mary Maher, and Bronwen Weber — 24 hours to design and create their cake for a set of sextuplets. Ultimately, Mary Maher was crowned champion, winning a $50,000 grand prize.

In April 2011, Food Network launched a second series of Last Cake Standing, in a separate 'spin-off' format with eight competitors and a $100,000 grand prize.

Notable competitors 
 Courtney Clark — runner-up of Last Cake Standing 2009, winner of 2 other Challenge episodes
 Norman Davis
 Jason Ellis — of 10 episodes he has been on, Ellis has won twice. He won the "Mystery Cake" challenge with a cake for Kerry Vincent's birthday.
 Anna Ellison of Ace of Cakes
 Michelle and Valentin "Vinny" Garcia
 Duff Goldman of Ace of Cakes
 Alex Guarnaschelli — frequent Chopped judge
 Lori Hutchinson of The Caketress
 Lauren Kitchens
 Mary Maher — winner of Last Cake Standing 2009
 Mike McCarey of Mike's Amazing Cakes
 Marc Murphy — frequent Chopped judge
 Ashlee Perkins of Minette Rushing Custom Cakes
 Colette Peters
 James Roselle — won his first four appearances on Challenge
 Richard Ruskell — has won six times on Challenge. He was also the winner of Last Cake Standing in 2011.
 Joshua John Russell — best friends with Jason Ellis since college.
 Orlando Serrano and Miguel Garcia — won 5 challenges including "Extreme Urban Legends" for which they created the world's first animatronic talking cake.
 Marina Sousa
Rachael Teufel completed in three Challenges,  Roller Derby Cakes 2010 (2nd place), Mardi Gras Cakes 2011 (2nd place), and took home the grand prize on Halloween Ghost Stories 2011 
 Buddy Valastro of Cake Boss — won the "Battle of the Brides" challenge in Season 7.
 Bronwen Weber — competed in 22 challenges. As of September 25, 2011, she has the most wins of any competitor in the show with a total of 8 wins.
Cody Rhodes

Episode guide

References

External links
 
 

2000s American cooking television series
2005 American television series debuts
2013 American television series endings
2019 American television series debuts
2020 American television series endings
2010s American cooking television series
2020s American cooking television series
Cooking competitions in the United States
Food Network original programming
Food reality television series